Sidi Abdullah Al-Sha'ab was a Libyan Sufi scholar who died in the 16th century CE.

Mausoleum 
Located in Tripoli, the Abdullah Al-Sha'ab mausoleum containing his grave as well as the grave of about 50 other respected scholars, and was a religious place for local Sufi community. The Wall Street Journal reported that the mausoleum was bulldozed in Tripoli on 25 August 2012, under the view of local security forces. Salafists are suspected of being responsible for the destruction. The actions have been criticized by the President's office. Reuters received a report that, surprised by the firepower of the militia leading the action, local security forces had to make a swift trade off, eventually choosing to seal the area to reduce clashes while letting the demolition take place.

See also
Abd As-Salam Al-Asmar

References

Libyan scholars
Sufi writers
16th-century deaths
Year of birth missing
Year of death missing